The Battle of Fehmarn (1644) took place north-west of the island of Fehmarn, now part of Germany, in the Baltic Sea. A combined Swedish fleet, with a large element of hired Dutch ships, defeated a Danish-Norwegian fleet and took 1000 prisoners, including Ulfeldt, Grabov and von Jasmund. The Danish admiral Pros Mund was killed in the battle.

The Swedes had 16 ships with 392 guns, and the Dutch element had 21 ships with 483 guns (making a total of 37 ships with 875 guns). The Danes had 17 ships with 448 guns. The Swedes expended two fireships and the Dutch lost one ship. The Danes lost 10 ships captured, including their largest three, and two wrecked.

The battle 
On the morning of 13 October the Swedish-Dutch fleet weighed anchor and prepared for battle by dividing into two Swedish and three Dutch squadrons. One of the Swedish squadrons was led by Wrangel on Smålands Lejon and the other under vice admiral Peter Blum on Draken. The Dutch squadrons were commanded by Thijssen onboard Jupiter, vice admiral Henrik Gerretsen on Groote Dolphijn and schout-bij-nacht  Pieter Marcussen on Groot Vliessingen.

The Danish-Norwegiam fleet was divided in two squadrons under admiral Pros Mund on Patentia and Joachim Grabow on Lindormen. Around 10 am the larger ships in both fleets were within firing range of each other and started firing. The smaller Danish ships retreated from the battle, but were pursued by the Dutch ships.

Early in the battle the Swedish flagship Smålands Lejon was so damaged in her rigging and hull that she had to pull out. The Swedish ships Regina and Göteborg attacked and boarded the Danish flagship Patentia. The Danish admiral Pros Mund was killed during the fighting.

The Swedish fire ship Meerman was sent against the Danish Lindormen, which quickly caught fire and exploded. The wreck was discovered in 2012. Swedish Nya Fortuna captured the Danish man-of-war Oldenborg by boarding. The last man-of-war Tre Løver veered off, but was pursued by Anckarhjelm's Dutch Jupiter, Patentia and Swarte Arent. Tre Løver managed to sink Swarte Arent  before the two other Dutch ships boarded her.

The smaller Danish vessels Tu Løver, Havhesten, and Fides were captured by Dutch Jupiter and Groote Dolphijn. A cluster of Danish ships were forced against the shore of Lolland, among them Neptunus, Nellebladet, Stormarn, and Kronet Fisk. These were later towed by the Dutch. Danish Delmenhorst went aground and exploded after being set on fire by the Swedish fire ship Delfin.  Danish Markatten, Højenhald and a galleot also went aground, but cannon fire from land protected them from the Dutch. Only Pelikanen and Lammet managed to escape and sail to Copenhagen on 17 October.

Consequences 
The Danes lost twelve ships, of which ten were captured. A hundred men perished and about 1,000 were captured. The ship Swarte Arent was the only loss on the Swedish side; its crew was rescued. In total, the Swedish side suffered only 59 deaths.

The victory was one of the greatest in the history of the Royal Swedish Navy. Even if transshipping Torstensson's soldiers to the Danish islands was no longer a threat, since these were now intent on meeting general Gallas' Imperial troops approaching from the south, the Danes realized that Sweden had total naval dominance after the battle. This paved the way for negotiations and eventually the treaty of Brömsebro on 13 August 1645.

Ships involved

Sweden
Drake 40
Smålands Lejon 32 (flag)
Göteborg 36
Leopard 36
Regina 34
Tre Kroner 32
Jägare 26
Vesterviks Fortuna 24
Akilles 22
Svan 22
Gamla Fortuna 18
Lam 12 (galley)
Fenix 10 (galley)
Postpferd 2 (galley/galliot)
Lilla Delfin (fireship) - Burnt
Meerman (fireship) - Burnt
? (merchantman)

Dutch element of Swedish fleet
Delphin 38
Jupiter 34
Engel 34
Gekroende Liefde 31
Coninchva Sweden 28
Campen 26
Den Swarten Raven 26
Vlissingen 24
Nieuw Vlissingen 24
St Matthuis 24
Patientia 24
Arent/Adelaar 22 - Sunk by Tre Løver
Nieuw Gottenburg 22
Liefde van Hoorn 20
Prins 20
Wapen van Medenblik 20
Posthorn 20
Brouwer 20
St Marten 20
Harderinne 8
? 2 (galliot)

Denmark
Patienta 48 (flag, Pros Mund) - Captured
Tre Løver 46 - Captured
Oldenborg 42 - Captured
Lindorm 38 (Henrik Mund)
Pelican 36
Stormar 32 (Corfits Ulfeldt) - Captured
Delmenhorst 28 (Hans Knudsen) - Captured
Fides 28 - Captured
Neptunus 28 - Captured
Nelleblad 24 - Captured
To Løver 22 - Captured
Kronet Fisk 20 - Aground and captured
Lam 16
Markat 16
Havhest 14
Højenhald 8 - Wrecked
? 2 (galley/galliot) - Wrecked

Sources 

 Lars Ericson Wolke, Martin Hårdstedt, Medströms Bokförlag (2009). Svenska sjöslag

1644 in Denmark
Fehmarn 1644
Fehmarn 1644
Fehmarn
1644 in Europe